Valona is an unincorporated community in McIntosh County, Georgia, United States.

History
A post office was established at Valona in 1898. The community was named after Valona, in Albania.

References

Unincorporated communities in McIntosh County, Georgia
Unincorporated communities in Georgia (U.S. state)
Populated coastal places in Georgia (U.S. state)